The Parc régional des Appalaches (in English: Appalaches Regional Park) is a regional park located in Montmagny Regional County Municipality in the region of Chaudière-Appalaches, in Quebec, Canada. This park includes lakes, forests, rivers, marshes, peat bogs and mountains.

Mission 
The "Parc régional des Appalaches" is a non-profit organization registered on 10 January 1997 at Registre des entreprises du Québec and its head-office is at Sainte-Lucie-de-Beauregard.

Toponymy 
The toponym "Parc régional des Appalaches" derives from the mountain range where it is located.

The toponym "Parc régional des Appalaches" was registered as of 28 September 2004 at the "Banque de noms de lieux" of Commission de toponymie du Québec.

Activities 
Created in 1997, in the heart of the Appalachian forest, the Appalachian Park is made up of many natural sites where we find eskers, waterfalls, peat bogs, lakes, rivers, mountains, the highest of which is the Grande Coulée Mountain, Sugar Loaf Mountain and Talon Lake mountain. You will therefore find hiking trails, cycle paths and a canoe route in the summer season. In winter, snowshoeing and snow scooters are practiced on several trails in the Park. All the trails are adorned with sidewalks, stairs, walkways, gazebos and shelters, as well as resort infrastructure such as rustic or serviced campsites and shelters.

For their accommodation in the park, visitors can choose from a network of campsites, huts and cabins.

The network of hiking trails allows to be in contact with the wild nature and to view panoramas of lakes, rivers and mountains. Trails allow you to climb Mount Sugard Loaf and Montagne Grande Coulée, to their respective summit. Around thirty arched or suspended footbridges have been fitted out on the hiking trails to span rivers or bodies of water.

Footpaths 
The park has a network of 140 km of hiking trails.

* Winter trail only

Notes and references

External links 
 Parc des Appalaches

Protected areas of Chaudière-Appalaches
Montmagny Regional County Municipality
Regional Parks of Quebec
Protected areas established in 1997